No Refunds and similar can mean:
No Refunds (film), Doug Stanhope's third stand-up DVD
See Returning (in the sense of a customer taking previously purchased merchandise back to the retailer)

See also
 Refund (disambiguation)